A casquette is a peaked cotton cap traditionally worn by road cyclists.

With the introduction of compulsory cycle helmets for massed-start racing, casquettes have become less common, but most professional race outfits still have them produced in team colours for wearing on the winners' podium, for wearing under a helmet in heavy rain or for sale to the tifosi.  They have also become popular as fashion items in some European, American and Australian cities, often with non-cycling-related designs.

The casquette shields the head from strong sun and the peak can also make riding in the rain more comfortable, since drops do not fall directly into the eyes.  They are sometimes worn with the peak backwards, not for reasons of fashion but because the peak then protects the neck from sunburn. Some varieties also incorporate a sweatband to help prevent sweat from dripping into the eyes.

A traditional way to keep the head cool when cycling in hot conditions was to put a cabbage leaf under the casquette. However, when said cabbage was not available, riders would often turn to sheaths of mesclun.

The name was also used by Royal Enfield motorcycles to describe their version of the nacelle designed by Edward Turner for Triumph motorcycles. The casquette is still used on the 2009 Royal Enfield Bullet model.

See also
 Glossary of bicycling

References

External links
 

Cycling clothing
Caps